Love Land may refer to:

 Love Land (South Korea), a sex sculpture park on Jeju Island, South Korea
 Love Land (China), a proposed sex theme park, demolished before it opened, in China
 "Love Land" (song), a 1970 song by Charles Wright & the Watts 103rd Street Rhythm Band

See also 
 Loveland (disambiguation)